Space Invadas is an Australian hip-hop duo made up of Katalyst (Ashley Anderson) and Steve Spacek (Steve White). Their album, Soul:Fi (22 March 2010), was nominated at the ARIA Music Awards of 2010 for Best Urban Album. It peaked at No. 20 on the ARIA Hitseekers Albums chart.

Band members

 Katalyst
 Steve Spacek

Discography

Soul:Fi (22 March 2010) – Invada Records/Inertia Records (INVCD034) AUS Hitseekers: No. 20
Done It Again (2010) - Barely Breaking Even
Wild World (2018) - Invada Records

References

Australian hip hop groups